Pedro Klempa (born 23 November 1941) is an Argentine alpine skier. He competed in three events at the 1964 Winter Olympics.

References

1941 births
Living people
Argentine male alpine skiers
Olympic alpine skiers of Argentina
Alpine skiers at the 1964 Winter Olympics
Sportspeople from Vienna